The Battle of Taku Forts may refer to:

 Battle of Taku Forts (1858), an unsuccessful Chinese defense during the Second Opium War
 Battle of Taku Forts (1859), a successful Chinese defense during the Second Opium War
 Battle of Taku Forts (1860), an unsuccessful Chinese defense during the Second Opium War
 Battle of Taku Forts (1900), an unsuccessful Chinese defense during the Boxer Rebellion